The Asian Tour 2013/2014 – Event 2 (also known as the 2013 Zhangjiagang Open) was a professional minor-ranking snooker tournament that took place between 23 and 27 September 2013 at the Zhangjiagang Sports Center in Zhangjiagang, China.

Ju Reti won his first professional title by defeating Michael Holt 4–1 in the final. Ju became the first amateur player to win a Players Tour Championship title.

Prize fund and ranking points 
The breakdown of prize money and ranking points of the event is shown below:

1 Only professional players can earn ranking points.

Main draw

Top half

Section 1

Section 2

Section 3

Section 4

Bottom half

Section 5

Section 6

Section 7

Section 8

Finals

Century breaks 

 142  Ju Reti
 141  Ding Junhui
 137  Niu Zhuang
 135, 122, 110  Zhou Yuelong
 132  Scott Donaldson
 127  Paul Davison
 125  Liu Chuang
 122  Mark Joyce

 118, 105  Tang Jun
 116  Huang Hooyong
 108, 108  Michael Holt
 107, 101  Ben Woollaston
 104  Daniel Wells
 103, 100  Liang Wenbo
 103  David Grace
 101  Mike Dunn

References 

AT2
2013 in Chinese sport
Snooker competitions in China